This article contains a list of scientific research institutes in the United Kingdom that are owned by the government.

Biotechnology and Biological Sciences Research Council

Babraham Institute
Pirbright Institute
Institute of Food Research
Institute of Grassland and Environmental Research
John Innes Centre
Earlham Institute
Roslin Institute
Rothamsted Research
Silsoe Research Institute (ceased operations in 2006)

Science and Technology Facilities Council

Formerly Particle Physics and Astronomy Research Council
Chilbolton Observatory
Daresbury Laboratory
Rutherford Appleton Laboratory
HM Nautical Almanac Office
Diamond Light Source (86% stake, with the other 14% owned by the Wellcome Trust)
UK Astronomy Technology Centre

Department for Environment, Food and Rural Affairs

Central Science Laboratory (defunct)
Centre for Environment, Fisheries and Aquaculture Science
Veterinary Laboratories Agency

Department of Health

National Radiological Protection Board

Department for Business, Innovation and Skills

National Physical Laboratory
National Nuclear Laboratory
Meteorological Office

Ministry of Defence

Atomic Weapons Establishment
Defence Science and Technology Laboratory
Alverstoke
Bedford
Farnborough
Fort Halstead
Malvern
Pershore
Porton Down
Portsdown West
Winfrith

Medical Research Council

Cognition and Brain Sciences Unit
Laboratory of Molecular Biology
Clinical Sciences Centre
Francis Crick Institute
National Institute for Medical Research (now defunct)
Sorby Research Institute (now defunct)

Natural Environment Research Council

British Antarctic Survey
British Geological Survey
Centre for Ecology and Hydrology
National Oceanography Centre
 Plymouth Marine Laboratory
National Centre for Atmospheric Science

References

Government research
Innovation in the United Kingdom
UK government scientific
Science
Research institutes in the United Kingdom
Science and technology in the United Kingdom
Government scientific research institutes